Ian Lloyd Anderson (born 4 June 1986) is an Irish actor best known for his role as Dean in Love/Hate. In 2015, Anderson  joined the cast of the HBO series Game of Thrones in season 5 as Derek.

Personal life 
Anderson is married with children and resides in Dublin. He has expressed a lack of desire in pursuing an acting career in Hollywood.

Filmography

Television

Film

Theatre

References

External links
 

Living people
1986 births
Male actors from Dublin (city)
Irish male television actors